Chefe Caroa is a village in Ancuabe District in Cabo Delgado Province in northeastern Mozambique.

It is located southwest of the district capital of Ancuabe.

References

External links 
Satellite map at Maplandia.com 

Populated places in Ancuabe District